The 1997 Towson Tigers football team was an American football team that represented Towson University during the 1997 NCAA Division I-AA football season. In its first year of Patriot League play, Towson finished last.

For their sixth year under head coach Gordy Combs, the Tigers claim a 3–7 overall record, 1–5 in their inaugural Patriot League campaign. 

The team's record book counts the season-opening Holy Cross matchup as a Towson win, though the university agreed in October 1997 to forfeit the match, as it had used an academically ineligible player in that game. 

The Patriot League lists Towson's record as 2–8 overall, 0–6 in league play, the worst record in the league. Towson was outscored 233 to 126. Without the forfeit, Towson's league record would have improved to 1–5 and Holy Cross' would have dropped to 1–5, placing the Tigers and Crusaders in a tie for last place. 

Towson played its home games at Minnegan Stadium on the university campus in Towson, Maryland.

Schedule

References

Towson
Towson Tigers football seasons
Towson Tigers football